Daviot (Gaelic: Deimhidh) is an affluent village in Aberdeenshire, 4 miles from the busy town of Inverurie.  It is the birthplace of theologian William Robinson Clark.

Daviot has one of the best examples of Neolithic stone circles in the north east of Scotland, Loanhead of Daviot stone circle, which comprises 10 stones plus one recumbent stone.  Other interesting features are the House of Daviot, a disused old people's home recently bought and refurbished privately, a Schlumberger explosives facility (on a nearby hill), and the first GM crop field in Scotland.

In Daviot there is also a pub (The Smiddy Bar).

See also
Mounie Castle

External links

 Daviot website

Villages in Aberdeenshire
Neolithic Scotland
Stone circles in Aberdeenshire